Kim Sammaekjong  (526–576; reign 540–576) was the 24th monarch of Silla, one of the Three Kingdoms of Korea.

He followed King Beopheung (r. 514–540) and was followed by King Jinji (r. 576–579). Jinheung was the nephew / grandson of King Beopheung. King Jinheung was one of the greatest kings of Silla, and was responsible for expanding Silla territory immensely. He and King Seong 26th king of Baekje, struggled with each other over the Han River valley. Jinheung won this struggle and expanded Silla's territory immensely.

Rise to the throne 
King Jinheung of Silla rose to the throne at a young age when his predecessor and paternal uncle / maternal grandfather, Beopheung, died. Since he was too young to rule a kingdom at the time, his mother Queen Jiso acted as regent. When he became of age, he began to rule independently. One of his first acts as true king of Silla was to appoint a man named Kim Isabu as Head of Military Affairs, which occurred in 541. Jinheung adopted a policy of peace with the neighbouring kingdom of Baekje Kingdom. In 551, he allied with Baekje so that he could attack the northern Korean kingdom of Goguryeo. The result of this allied attack on Goguryeo was the conquest of the Han river estuary. The kingdoms of Baekje and Silla agreed on splitting the conquered territory equally between themselves.

Expansion 

During the reign of King Seong of Baekje, King Jinheung allied with Goguryeo and launched an attack on the Han River valley during the year 553. In a secret agreement between Silla and Goguryeo, Silla troops attacked the exhausted Baekje army in late 553. Feeling the betrayal from Silla, King Seong attacked during the year 554, but was caught in an ambush led by a Silla general and was assassinated along with those who were accompanying him. King Jinheung guarded the new territory with a firm hand for seven years before sending General Kim Isabu to conquer Daegaya in 561. King Jinheung constructed a monument in his newly conquered territory and established provinces in the area. He subdued all rebellions and continued to develop culture in his kingdom. In 576, the Hwarang was established, and they would later play a huge role in the unification of the Three Kingdoms of Korea.

Death and succession 
King Jinheung died in 576 at the age of 51. His 37-year rule of Silla was characterised by conquest and advancement. King Jinheung was succeeded by his second son, Prince Geumryun, who became King Jinji of Silla.

Family 

Father: Galmunwang Ipjong (입종 갈문왕)
Grandfather: King Jijeung of Silla (신라 지증왕) (437 – 514)
Grandmother: Queen Yeonje of the Miryang Park clan (연제태후 박씨)
Mother: Queen Jiso (지소태후) (? – 574)
Grandfather: King Beopheung of Silla (신라 법흥왕) (? - July 540)
Grandmother: Princess Bodo of Silla (보도부인)
Consorts and their Respective Issue(s)
Queen Sado of the Park clan (사도왕후 박씨) (? – February 614)
Crown Prince Dongryun (동륜태자) (? – 572)
King Jinji of Silla (신라 진지왕) (? – 24 August 579)
Kim Gu-ryun (김구륜)
Princess Taeyang (태양공주)
Princess Ayang (아양공주)
Princess Eunryun (은륜공주)
Princess Wolryun (월륜공주)
Princess Sukmyeong (숙명궁주) (? – 603)
Crown Prince Jeongsuk (정숙태자)
Princess Bomyeong (보명궁주)
Lady Mishil (미실궁주)
Prince Sujong (수종전군)
Princess Banya (반야공주)
Princess Nanya (난야공주)
Lady Sobi of Baekje (소비)
Princess Wolhwa (월화궁주)
Prince Cheonju (천주공)
Princess Deokmyeong (덕명공주)
Lady Geumjin (금진낭주 )
Princess Nanseong (난성공주)

Legacy 
King Jinheung's achievements for his kingdom established the basis for unification of Korea. He is remembered today by the Korean people as one of the greatest rulers of Silla.

Popular culture
 Portrayed by Lee Sun-jae in the 2009 MBC TV series Queen Seondeok.
 Portrayed by Park Hyung-sik in the 2016–2017 KBS2 TV series Hwarang: The Poet Warrior Youth.
 Portrayed by Kim Yoon Hong in the 2017 KBS TV series Chronicles of Korea
 Portrayed by Kim Seung-soo in the 2021 KBS2 TV series River Where the Moon Rises

See also
 List of Korean monarchs#Silla
 History of Korea

References

Silla rulers
Silla Buddhist monks
Korean Buddhist monarchs
526 births
576 deaths
6th-century monarchs in Asia
6th-century Korean people